Lester Carrington Dole (July 8, 1855 – December 10, 1918), was a Major League Baseball outfielder who played in  in one game with the New Haven Elm Citys.

He was born in Meriden, Connecticut. After baseball, he worked as the athletic trainer at St. Paul's School in Concord, New Hampshire for 40 years. He died from pneumonia in Concord on December 10, 1918.

References

External links

1855 births
1918 deaths
Baseball players from Connecticut
Major League Baseball outfielders
New Haven Elm Citys players
19th-century baseball players